This is a list of Japanese football J2 League transfers in the winter transfer window 2015–16 by club.

Source:

Matsumoto Yamaga 

In:

Out:

Shimizu S-Pulse 

In:

Out:

Montedio Yamagata 

In:

Out:

Cerezo Osaka 

In:

Out:

Ehime FC 

In:

Out:

V-Varen Nagasaki 

In:

Out:

Giravanz Kitakyushu 

In:

Out:

Tokyo Verdy 

In:

Out:

JEF United Chiba 

In:

Out:

Consadole Sapporo 

In:

Out:

Fagiano Okayama 

In:

Out:

Zweigen Kanazawa 

In:

Out:

Roasso Kumamoto 

In:

Out:

Tokushima Vortis 

In:

Out:

Yokohama FC 

In:

Out:

Kamatamare Sanuki 

In:

Out:

Kyoto Sanga 

In:

Out:

Thespakusatsu Gunma 

In:

Out:

Mito Hollyhock 

In:

Out:

FC Gifu 

In:

Out:

Renofa Yamaguchi 

In:

Out:

Machida Zelvia 

In:

Out:

References 

2015-16
Transfers
Japan